Alex Nelson (born March 22, 1975) is an American singer-songwriter whose work is a blend of acoustic/electric guitar-driven indie rock/pop/electronica.

Early life and college years

Nelson was born in Beaumont, Texas and began taking piano lessons at an early age.  It was not until high school that he began to play guitar on a regular basis.  After moving from Texas to Florida, Nelson attended Nova Southeastern University in Davie, Florida, where he began making a name for himself in the local music circuit.  It was at this time that he met Dillon Partin, Paul Roub and Marshall Willner from the band Crash Basket.  After Partin's departure from the band, Nelson was asked to join the band to fill in on the bass. The group disbanded in 1996, and Nelson began his solo career.

Discography
Sober Rover (1995)
How Did We End Up Here? (2006)
Everything You Wanted to Say But Didn't... (2009)

References
 Singers Words Strike a Chord Sun-Sentinel August 7, 2009
 How Alex Nelson Ended Up Here  Metromix  August 18, 2009

External links
 Official Site

1975 births
Living people
American singer-songwriters
21st-century American singers